Zagyvaszántó is a village located in Heves, Hungary, among the foothills of the Mátra mountain range. The closest significant town is Hatvan.

Etymology 
Its name consists of two Hungarian words: 'Zagyva' and 'szántó'. Zagyva is the river which runs next to the village, while 'szántó''' means 'field'.

 History 
The settlement's name is first mentioned in 1290 in a diploma, in which it is called 'Zántho' (which is the equivalent of 'szántó'''). During the Ottoman-Hungarian wars the region was depopulated. In the middle of the 1900s the population started to rise rapidly. Since the start of the millennium the population is slowly decreasing.

The 700th anniversary was celebrated in 1999.

International relations 
Zagyvaszántó is the sister city of Csomakoros, Romania.

References

Populated places in Heves County